First-seeded Rod Laver defeated Roy Emerson 8–6, 0–6, 6–4, 6–4 in the final to win the men's singles tennis title at the 1962 Australian Championships.

Seeds
The seeded players are listed below. Rod Laver is the champion; others show the round in which they were eliminated.

  Rod Laver (champion)
  Roy Emerson (finalist)
  Neale Fraser (semifinals)
  Bob Hewitt (semifinals)
  Fred Stolle (quarterfinals)
  Ken Fletcher (third round)
  John Newcombe (quarterfinals)
  John Fraser (second round)
  Boro Jovanović (second round)
  Wilhelm Bungert (quarterfinals)
  Nikola Pilić (second round)
  Premjit Lall (third round)
  Jaidip Mukerjea (third round)
  Ingo Buding (second round)
  Roger Taylor (third round)

Draw

Key
 Q = Qualifier
 WC = Wild card
 LL = Lucky loser
 r = Retired

Finals

Earlier rounds

Section 1

Section 2

Section 3

Section 4

External links
 1962 Australian Championships on ITFtennis.com, the source for this draw

1962 in tennis
1962
1962 in Australian tennis